Anisolophia is a genus of beetles in the family Cerambycidae, containing the following species:

 Anisolophia cultrifera (White, 1855)
 Anisolophia glauca Melzer, 1934

References

Acanthocinini